William Scott Musgrave (born November 11, 1967) is an American football coach and former player who is the senior offensive assistant for the Cleveland Browns of the National Football League (NFL). He is also a former quarterback, offensive coordinator and quarterbacks coach for multiple National Football League (NFL) teams. He played college football at the University of Oregon.

Musgrave is a 21-year coaching veteran with 19 years of NFL experience as a quarterbacks coach or offensive coordinator. He has previously coached in the NFL with the Denver Broncos (2017–18), Oakland Raiders (2015–16, 1997), Philadelphia Eagles (2014, 1998), Minnesota Vikings (2011–13), Atlanta Falcons (2006–10), Washington Redskins (2005), Jacksonville Jaguars (2003–04) and Carolina Panthers (1999–2000). During his coaching career, Musgrave helped three different quarterbacks to Pro Bowl seasons: Derek Carr (2015–16), Matt Ryan (2010) and Steve Beuerlein (1999).

Early years
Musgrave attended Grand Junction High School, earning All-conference honors at safety as a sophomore. The next year he was named the starter at quarterback and earned All-conference honors in his last 2 seasons.

He was the Colorado High School Athlete of the Year in 1985, after registering 30 touchdown passes (a state record). He also received the Denver Post Gold Helmet Award as the state's top scholar football athlete.

College career
Musgrave accepted a football scholarship from the University of Oregon, at a time when the school had only four winning seasons in the last 22 years and hadn't been invited to a bowl game since 1963. He became a starter as a freshman, leading his team to a No. 16 national ranking, including wins against USC and Washington. 

As a sophomore, he helped Oregon achieve a top 20 ranking and a 6-1 record, until breaking his collarbone against Arizona State University. The team went winless in the last 4 games.

As a junior, he posted 3,081 passing yards, 22 touchdowns and 16 interceptions. Against BYU, he passed for a then school-record 489 yards, combining with Cougars quarterback Ty Detmer who tallied 470 passing yards, to set an NCAA record for passing yardage in a game by two players.

As a senior, he was named team MVP, first-team All-conference quarterback, GTE Academic All-American of the Year, and earned a Scholar-Athlete Award by the National Football Foundation and Hall of Fame. In his final game he injured his shoulder in the fourth quarter against UCLA, only to return and throw a 16-yard touchdown pass with 2:10 remaining for a 28–24 win.

He was a four-year starter at quarterback and a three-year team captain, while leading the Oregon to its first bowl game in 26 years and to back-to-back bowl appearances for the first time in school history. He finished with 8,343 passing yards, a 57.4 passing percentage, 60 touchdowns and 40 interceptions. Musgrave finished as the school's all-time leader in passing yards and total offense, until being broken by Marcus Mariota in 2014. He set 15 passing records, while his 60 career passing touchdowns and 8,343 career yardage ranked second only to John Elway in Pacific-10 Conference history.

In 1996, he was inducted into the Colorado High School Activities Association Hall of Fame. In 2000, he was inducted into the University of Oregon Athletics Hall of Fame.

College statistics
1987: 139/234 for 1,836 yards with 13 TD vs 8 INT.
1988: 62/121 for 815 yards with 8 TD vs 4 INT.
1989: 231/401 for 3,081 yards with 22 TD vs 16 INT.
1990: 173/301 for 2,219 yards with 14 TD vs 12 INT.

Professional career

Musgrave was selected by the Dallas Cowboys in the fourth round (106th overall) of the 1991 NFL Draft. He went into training camp with Troy Aikman, Babe Laufenberg and Cliff Stoudt at quarterback. On August 25, the Cowboys traded for Steve Beuerlein to improve the backup position and released Musgrave and Stoudt, opting to keep just two quarterbacks.

On August 28, 1991, he was signed to the practice squad by the San Francisco 49ers. He was promoted to the active roster in week 11 and made his professional debut in the week 17 game against the Chicago Bears, throwing for a touchdown and 33 yards, after replacing Steve Young late in the contest. The next year, he was the fourth-string quarterback, until being placed on the injured reserve list on December 15. In 1993 and 1994, he was named the team's third-string quarterback and was rarely activated on game days. He played under head coach George Seifert and offensive coordinators Mike Holmgren and Mike Shanahan.

In 1995, he signed as a free agent with the Denver Broncos, reuniting with Shanahan, who was the new team's head coach. He was the backup quarterback behind John Elway, before announcing his retirement on July 22, 1997.

Following a brief coaching stint as the quarterbacks coach of the Oakland Raiders, Musgrave signed with the Indianapolis Colts on April 8, 1998, but was released during training camp.

Coaching career

1997−1998
Immediately after being released as a player, Musgrave joined the Oakland Raiders as a quarterbacks coach in 1997 under head coach Joe Bugel. When the Raiders fired Bugel following the season, Musgrave attempted another try as a player with the Colts in 1998, but was released during training camp. He was immediately hired by the Philadelphia Eagles as an offensive assistant under Ray Rhodes, a former 49ers assistant coach. Musgrave was promoted to offensive coordinator and called plays in place of Dana Bible for the final 10 games of the season. However, Musgrave was not retained by new head coach Andy Reid when Rhodes was fired at the end of the season.

Carolina Panthers
Musgrave was hired as the quarterbacks coach under George Seifert with the Carolina Panthers in 1999, in an arrangement that saw he and Seifert having a heavy hand in calling the plays over offensive coordinator Gil Haskell.  Upon Haskell's departure to Seattle, Musgrave was promoted to offensive coordinator in 2000. The team chose him to replace Haskell, who was a holdover from a previous staff, due to his favorable relationship with Seifert as well as his experience calling plays the previous season. However, as an inexperienced coordinator, Musgrave had faltered at times, been criticized in the media for choices in playcalling, and was at one point rumored to have been yelled at by Seifert in front of the team. Musgrave resigned from the position after three games.

Virginia
Musgrave was hired as offensive coordinator, quarterbacks coach, and tight ends coach under Al Groh for the Virginia Cavaliers in 2001, tutoring quarterback Matt Schaub to school records in his two years as coach.

Jacksonville Jaguars
Musgrave was hired as the offensive coordinator for the Jacksonville Jaguars under new head coach Jack Del Rio in 2003. In 2004, he picked up additional duties as quarterbacks coach before he was fired at the conclusion of the season.

Atlanta Falcons
Musgrave was the quarterbacks coach for the Atlanta Falcons from 2006–2009. In 2010, Musgrave was promoted to assistant head coach/quarterbacks coach. Coaching quarterbacks with very different skillsets, Musgrave played a large role in the development of Michael Vick (2006), Matt Schaub (2006) and Matt Ryan (2008-10).

Minnesota Vikings
Musgrave was hired by the Minnesota Vikings to the position of offensive coordinator under head coach Leslie Frazier on January 16, 2011. The Vikings posted the top-ranked rushing offense in the league over that span, and Adrian Peterson had his 2,000 rushing yards season and received the AP NFL Offensive Player of the Year Award in 2012. After three seasons with the Vikings, he was not retained by new head coach Mike Zimmer after the 2013 season.

Philadelphia Eagles
Musgrave was hired by the Philadelphia Eagles as the team's quarterbacks coach on January 27, 2014. The Eagles finished sixth in the league in passing offense (272.3 ypg) despite splitting time between two quarterbacks. Nick Foles and Mark Sanchez started eight games apiece for the Eagles and combined to throw for 4,581 yards—a total topped by only five NFL quarterbacks that season.

Oakland Raiders
Musgrave was hired by head coach Jack Del Rio on January 19, 2015, to serve as offensive coordinator. Musgrave took over an offense that ranked last in the NFL in total offense (282.2 ypg) and 31st in scoring (15.9 ppg) in 2014. The Raiders made the biggest offensive improvement in the NFL in yards per game (+91.1) and scoring (+10.2 ppg) in two seasons under Musgrave, finishing in the top seven in the league in both categories in 2016 (373.3 ypg/26.0 ppg). The Raiders’ offensive resurgence was spurred by the development of quarterback Derek Carr, who in two seasons in Musgrave’s offense passed for nearly 8,000 yards to go along with 60 touchdowns.

On January 10, 2017, Musgrave's contract was not renewed, and was let go by head coach Jack Del Rio after losing to the Houston Texans in a wild card playoff game.

Denver Broncos
Musgrave was hired by the Broncos on January 13, 2017 to serve as the quarterbacks coach under new head coach Vance Joseph. He was promoted to offensive coordinator following the firing of offensive coordinator Mike McCoy on November 20, 2017. The Broncos posted a 6–10 record during the 2018–19 season. Musgrave's offense finished ranked 19th in total yards, 12th in rushing yards, and 19th in passing yards.

Following the 2018–19 season, the Broncos hired Vic Fangio as head coach and did not retain Musgrave.

California
On January 3, 2020, Musgrave was announced as the offensive coordinator for the California Golden Bears, replacing Beau Baldwin and marking his return to the college ranks after 18 years. Musgrave was let go on November 13, 2022 after the Golden Bears lost their sixth game in a row to Oregon State.

Cleveland Browns
On February 26, 2023, Musgrave was announced as a senior offensive assistant under HC Kevin Stefanski.

References

External links
 

1967 births
Living people
American football quarterbacks
Atlanta Falcons coaches
California Golden Bears football coaches
Carolina Panthers coaches
Dallas Cowboys players
Denver Broncos players
Indianapolis Colts players
Jacksonville Jaguars coaches
Minnesota Vikings coaches
Oakland Raiders coaches
Oregon Ducks football players
National Football League offensive coordinators
Philadelphia Eagles coaches
San Francisco 49ers players
Virginia Cavaliers football coaches
Washington Redskins coaches
People from Grand Junction, Colorado
Players of American football from Colorado